This list is of the Cultural Properties of Japan designated in the category of  for the Prefecture of Toyama.

National Cultural Properties
As of 1 January 2015, three Important Cultural Properties have been designated, being of national significance.

Prefectural Cultural Properties
As of 1 January 2015, twelve properties have been designated at a prefectural level.

See also
 Cultural Properties of Japan
 List of National Treasures of Japan (paintings)
 Japanese painting
 List of Cultural Properties of Japan - historical materials (Toyama)
 List of Historic Sites of Japan (Toyama)

References

External links
  Cultural Properties in Toyama Prefecture
  Cultural Properties in Toyama Prefecture

Cultural Properties,Toyama
Cultural Properties,Paintings
Paintings,Toyama
Lists of paintings